Kim Bo-mi (born May 15, 1987) is a South Korean actress. Kim began studying ballet when she was 11 years old, and she later enrolled in Dance at Sejong University, with Ballet as her major subject. Then in 2008, she appeared in the cable show Star Replication Project 2%, which led to an exclusive contract with an entertainment agency. Kim made her acting debut that same year in Painter of the Wind, as the maid of a gisaeng. She has since appeared in supporting roles in films and television dramas, notably the blockbuster film Sunny (2011) and the popular drama My Love from the Star (2013).

Filmography

Television series

Film

Variety show

Music video

References

External links

 

Living people
1987 births
South Korean television actresses
South Korean film actresses
21st-century South Korean actresses
People from Suwon